Sketch Artist II: Hands That See, also known as Sketch Artist II and A Feel for Murder, is a 1995 American made-for-television crime-thriller film  written by Michael Angeli and directed by Jack Sholder and starring Jeff Fahey and Courteney Cox. It is a sequel to the 1992 film Sketch Artist.

Plot
Police artist Jack Whitfield (Fahey) is chasing a serial killer who seems to be unstoppable. The only surviving victim is Emmy O'Conner (Cox), who is blind. At first Jack is skeptical but she describes her attacker in uncanny detail and Jack becomes closer to catching the killer. But this man will stop at nothing to kill Emmy, the one who revealed his identity.

Cast

  Jeff Fahey as Jack Whitfield
  Courteney Cox as	Emmy O'Conner
  Michael Nicolosi	as	Rothko
  Jonathan Silverman as Glenn
  Michael Beach as George
  Scott Burkholder	as Zip
  John Prosky as Sherman Bochs
  Robbie T. Robinson as	Umpire
  Glenn Morshower as Bill Loman
  Paul Eiding as Sydney Burroughs
  Lin Shaye as Bonnie
  James Tolkan	as Tonelli
  Stephen Rappaport as Brady Mullins
  Cindy Katz as Gina Papamichael
  Aaron Seville as Ellison
 Brion James as Larry Walker

Reception
Variety said the script was "uneven" but "imaginative" and praised Fahey and especially Cox, who they called "terrific". They also praised Bryan England’s "cunning lensing", Virginia Lee’s production design, Michael Schweitzer’s editing, and Tim Truman’s score. Radio Times said it was an improvement on the first film "in regard to plot, if not in terms of casting, as the support team here is no substitute for the presence of Sean Young and Drew Barrymore in the original."

References

External links

1995 films
1995 television films
1995 thriller films
American television films
American thriller films
Films about artists
Films directed by Jack Sholder
1990s English-language films
1990s American films